The Stukeleys is a civil parish in the district of Huntingdonshire, in Cambridgeshire, England, consisting of the villages of Great Stukeley and Little Stukeley, and the new settlement of Alconbury Weald being built on the old RAF Alconbury site. The parish lies just north-west of Huntingdon.  As well as the two villages, the parish also includes Huntingdon racecourse. The East Coast Main Line runs across the eastern edge of the parish.  The A14 road runs south-east to north-west across the western half of the parish and has junction with the A1 road just outside the western border of the parish. Cambridgeshire County Council has its headquarters at New Shire Hall on the Alconbury Weald development in the parish.

Government
The Stukeleys has its own elected parish council that is responsible for providing and maintaining a variety of local services including the allotments, street lighting, play areas, grass cutting and tree planting.  It helps to maintain and extend the paths in the built area and the countryside, provides the bus shelter, litter, dog-waste and salt bins. A committee of the parish council reviews all planning applications and makes recommendations to Huntingdonshire District Council, which is the planning authority for the parish. The parish council also represents the views of the parish on issues such as local transport, policing and the environment. The parish council raises its own tax to pay for these services, known as the parish precept, which is collected as part of the Council Tax. In 2015, The Stukeleys parish council had nine members; meetings were held on the first Monday of a month either in Great Stukeley Village Hall or in Little Stukeley Village Hall

Demography

Population

All population census figures from report Historic Census figures Cambridgeshire to 2011 by Cambridgeshire Insight.

The parish of The Stukeleys was created on 1 April 1935 from the merger of the two former parishes of Great Stukeley and Little Stukeley.

Energy generation 
It started power generation in March 2014 and has a peak capacity of 24.7MWp; enough to power over 7,000 households.

References

External links

Huntingdonshire
Civil parishes in Cambridgeshire